Abdul Rashid Abbasi was an Azad Kashmiri politician who served as interim President of Azad Kashmir from 29 July 1991 to 12 August 1991.

References

Presidents of Azad Kashmir
Possibly living people
Year of birth missing